Salvatore "Tito" Morale (born 4 November 1938 in Teolo, Padua) is an Italian athlete who mainly competed in the 400 metre hurdles.

He won five medals, at senior level, at the International athletics competitions.

Biography
He competed for an Italy in the 400 metre hurdles at the 1964 Summer Olympics held in Tokyo, Japan,  where he won the bronze medal. In 1962 in the European Championships Morale won the gold medal in the 400 metres hurdles and equalled the world record of Glenn Davis. He has 22 caps in national team from 1956 to 1964.

European record
 400 metres hurdles: 49.2 (Belgrade, 14 September 1962), holder till 13 October 1968.

Olympic results

National titles
Salvatore Morale has won 4 times consecutively the individual national championship.
4 wins in the 400 metres hurdles (1957, 1958, 1960, 1961)

See also
 FIDAL Hall of Fame

References

External links
 

1938 births
Living people
Sportspeople from the Province of Padua
Italian male hurdlers
Olympic male hurdlers
Olympic athletes of Italy
Olympic bronze medalists for Italy
Olympic bronze medalists in athletics (track and field)
Athletes (track and field) at the 1960 Summer Olympics
Athletes (track and field) at the 1964 Summer Olympics
Medalists at the 1964 Summer Olympics
Universiade medalists in athletics (track and field)
Universiade gold medalists for Italy
Universiade bronze medalists for Italy
Medalists at the 1959 Summer Universiade
Medalists at the 1961 Summer Universiade
Medalists at the 1963 Summer Universiade
World record setters in athletics (track and field)
European Athletics Championships medalists
Japan Championships in Athletics winners
Italian Athletics Championships winners